JK Brackens is a Gaelic Athletic Association club serving the parish of Templemore, Clonmore and Killea in County Tipperary, Ireland.

JK Brackens compete in the county Tipperary GAA and Mid-Tipperary divisional competitions and is one of only two clubs in Tipperary that consistently complete at senior level in both the hurling and gaelic football. The club is also nationally renowned as one of the country's leading GAA Scór clubs. Currently, the club fields 21 teams from under 6 up to senior grades and has approximately 250 playing members.

The club is named after Joseph Kevin Bracken, "the radical stonemason from Templemore", who was one of the seven founding members of the Gaelic Athletic Association in 1884. Furthermore, Bracken was the first Chairman of the Tipperary County Board, he served as vice-president of the GAA, and of the original seven signatories, he was the longest serving member on the GAA national executive.  He was an elected representative and chairman of Templemore Urban District Council, and was a member of the oath-bound republican organisation the IRB (Irish Republican Brotherhood)

JK Brackens GAA club is one of only three GAA clubs to be named after both a founding member of the GAA, and a local parishioner.

History

Early Parish GAA – 1884-1980
The Gaelic Athletic Association was founded in Thurles on 1st November 1884 less than 14 kilometers from Templemore Town with prominent local resident Joseph Kevin Bracken one of the seven founding signatories. Bracken was a well known Parnellite, IRB affiliate and 'champion athlete' according to reports. These factors were possible reasons for Brackens invitation as a 'representative Irishman'. 

Brackens prominenence within the fledgling organisation influenced early formation of local GAA clubs, Templemore in 1886 with Killea, College Hill and Clonmore clubs formed soon after. 
The first recorded silverware claimed by a local selection was in Dublin on June 14th 1886 where the Templemore footballers played Faugh-a-Ballaghs with the Tipperary men claiming the cup and 21 Celtic Crosses. In 1887 Templemore represented Tipperary in the first All Ireland Football Championship defeating Commercials of Limerick in the first round on a scoreline of 9 points to 3.  However an objection was raised to this result and a rematch was ordered. A depleated  Templemore team lost the refixture on a scoreline of 1-9 to 4 and the Limerick side went on to win the inaugural All Ireland Football championship. 

Divisional honours were first achieved in 1909 when the Templemore Grattan Football Club won a North title, followed by Templemore Éire Óg claiming 12 Mid Football crowns from 1913 to 1964. During this period Éire Óg added 2 County Football Championships in 1925  (defeating Fethard 1-04 to 1-01), and in 1936 (defeating Arravale Rovers 2-05 to 1-06).  
Hurling was also to the fore during this period with Killea winning Mid Junior and Intermediate titles in '27 and '31 respectively, and a Senior Mid crown in '28 (a Castlininey amalgamation), and Clonmore claiming Mid Junior Hurling honours in 1931. Other Junior Hurling crowns of honourable mention were Collegehill victory in 1954 and Templemore Kickhams title in 1961.

In the early sixties Templemore joined forces with Drom at Minor level as Na Fianna winning 3 divisional hurling titles in '61, '62, '63 plus Mid football in '62, however the most significant year at underage (prior to the formation of the Brackens club) was in 1973 with Templemore Éire Óg claiming a first Minor A Football County Championship.

Pre-Formation Era – 1980-1992
The introduction of the “one club one parish” rule in 1961 saw rural GAA  clubs amalgamate to single parish clubs, however up until 1992 the Templemore parish maintained a disjointed approach to club GAA with the Éire Óg Club represented the area in football, Clonmore in intermediate hurling and the Killea club for junior hurling. Nonetheless as the GAA Centinary approached, local consensus grew for a more unified one parish club and throughout the decade prior to the club's formation, combined parish teams were entered in various competitions. 

In 1980 Clonmore and Killea amalgamated as Clonmore / Killea and enter hurling teams competing at junior, intermediate and senior levels. This arrangement continued until the GAA centenary year of '84 when Clonmore and Killea agreed to enter Junior and Intermediate competitions as single clubs but competed as one club at senior level, and it was under the name of JK Brackens that this group played as. The following year JK Brackens competed at Minor and Under 21 hurling only, however in ’86 and ‘87 the Brackens represented the parish at senior grade once more. A senior JK Brackens selection did not feature in 1988 as Clonmore had won promotion to senior ranks by virtue of winning the County Intermediate Huring Championship of 1987. Instead ‘The Brackens’ were represented at minor and under 21 grades only, and it was at these grades that JK Brackens claimed their first silverware, winning Mid Minor B and Mid Under 21 B hurling titles in 1989 and 1990 respectively.

The period from ‘79 to ‘91 was up to that point the most successful period for hurling in the parish, with Killea winning Junior A Mid titles in ‘89 and ‘91, (their first silverware since 1928), Clonmore winning Intermediate Mid title in ’79, ’84, ’86 and Mid and County honours in 1987. Add to this Minor and Under 21 B titles in ‘89 and ‘91 for the JK Brackens selection, the case for a single GAA club for the parish grew strong impedes with the common consensus amongst players and local club officials was that to compete and develop Gaelic Games locally, that a ‘one parish, one club’ approach should be adopted. It was also believed that Gaelic football in the parish would benefit from the inclusion of Templemore Éire Óg in a Clonmore Killea partnership.

Foundation to Present Day

In 1991, the three GAA clubs of the parish approached the county board seeking assistance to oversee the amalgamation process. Following a lengthy exercise in which county board appointees visited the parish on over a dozen occasions, the three clubs democratically voted their clubs out of existence for a 5-year period, and backed the formation of a single club. One of the most influencing factors in this decision was the voice of the playing members of the clubs, who voted by 56 to 3 in favour of an amalgamation.

In February 1992, at a special convention in Páirc Shíleáin, the attendance of close to 150 members of the three clubs, gave their overwhelming support to the new venture, and the JK Brackens GAA club was officially formed merging the former GAA clubs of Templemore Éire Óg, Clonmore GAA and Killea GAA, and thereafter was ratified by Mid and County Boards, and by Croke Park for a five-year period. In 1997 some members of the Killea GAA club decided to leave the partnership and reform into their old entity however many player from that catchment area decided to continue to play under the Brackens flag. 

The newly formed Club was an immediate success with the Intermediate footballer and hurlers both winning Mid championships in ‘92 and there were numerous titles at Minor, U16, U14 and U12 levels. The footballers repeated their achievement in ’93 and also added county honours, thus winning promotion to senior ranks where they have remained since. The Mid Intermediate Hurling championship was ultra-competitive at this time and included teams such as Drom-Inch GAA and Upperchurch-Drombane GAA. JK Brackens had to wait until ’96 and ’97 for further Intermediate titles to add to the trophy cabinet. ‘Brackens lost two successive county finals in both of these years however they won promotion to senior level by virtue of winning two divisional crowns in a row, and have subsequently competed at senior grade since.

1997 was also the year that the 'Brackens won their first county hurling title winning the Under 21 B championship in a side captained by Eamonn Corcoran. Further B hurling county titles were claimed in 2002 and 2004 at U21 and Minor levels respectively. The club had to wait until 2002 for their first title at senior level, winning the Mid Senior Football Championship, the first parish side to claim the trophy in 38 years. They have subsequently won the title 6 times since the turn of the millennium thus breaking the dominance of Loughmore-Castleiney GAA. Brackens won their title in senior hurling silverware winning the Cahill Cup in ’07 and ’08, and they won their first county titles at senior level in 2005 and 2006, winning the Tipperary Division 1 Football League, the former year a first senior county title for the parish in 69 years.

In 2016, JK Brackens GAA and Killea GAA agreed to join forces at minor and under 21 levels under the name JK Brackens Óg. In effect, this arrangement extended the agreed structures of the juvenile club up to 21 years of age, and therefore the teams had the full pick of the parish while players were free able to represent their own half at the parish at adult hurling. This agreement also facilitated players from Killea to play football with Brackens at Junior and Senior grades, as their club had no affiliated Gaelic football teams. The foresight of both clubs proved an instant success when the Brackens Óg line-up completed a historic double, winning the Mid Minor A football crown and the parishes first Minor A hurling title in a squad that boosted 3 members of the All-Ireland winning minor team of that year.

JKB Óg created further history in 2018 capturing the Minor and Under 21 A county titles becoming only the 6th Tipperary club to complete this remarkable double, and also bridged a parish gap of 45 years since a last A county title.

Honours
 Mid Tipperary Senior Hurling Championship: (2)
Killea: 1928
JK Brackens: 2022
 Tipperary Senior Hurling Championship Roinn II - Séamus Ó Riain Cup: (1) 
2019
 Tipperary Senior Football champions:  (2) 
Templemore Éire Óg: 1925, 1936
 Mid Tipperary Senior Football Championship: (19) 
Templemore Éire Óg: 1913, 1916, 1924, 1927, 1928, 1935, 1936, 1938, 1939, 1942, 1963, 1964
JK Brackens: 2002, 2006, 2011, 2013, 2014, 2019, 2022
 North Tipperary Senior Football Championship: (1) 
Templemore: 1909
 County Tipperary Intermediate Hurling Championship: (1) 
Clonmore: 1987
 Mid Tipperary Intermediate Hurling Championship: (7)  
Clonmore: 1979, 1984, 1986, 1987 
JK Brackens: 1992, 1996, 1997
 Tipperary Intermediate Football Championship: (1) 
1993 
 Mid Tipperary Intermediate Football Championship: (4) 
Templemore Éire Óg: 1982
JK Brackens: 1992, 1993, 2002
 Mid Tipperary Junior A Hurling Championship: (9) 
Clonmore: 1932, 1970, 1974, 1975, 1978 
Collegehill: 1954 
Templemore Kickhams: 1961 
JK Brackens: 1997, 1998
 Tipperary Junior A Football Championship: (3) 
Templemore Éire Óg: 1957, 1972
JK Brackens: 2018
 Mid Tipperary Junior A Football Championship: (13) 
Templemore Éire Óg: 1916, 1929, 1930, 1931, 1932, 1933, 1957, 1960, 1972
JK Brackens: 1997, 1999, 2000, 2018
 Mid Tipperary Junior B Hurling Championship: (2) 
1999, 2021
 Tipperary Junior B Football Championship: (1) 
2003
 Mid Tipperary Junior B Football Championship: (2) 
2003, 2007
 Tipperary Under-21 B Hurling Championship: (2) 
1997, 2002
 Mid Tipperary Under-21 B Hurling Championship: (6) 
Templemore Brackens: 1990
JK Brackens: 1993, 1997, 2002, 2009, 2014
 Tipperary Under-21 A Football Championship: (2) 
2018*, 2019*
 Mid Tipperary Under-21 A Football Championship: (12) 
Templemore Éire Óg: 1971, 1983, 1986, 1987, 1988, 1989
JK Brackens: 1998, 2008, 2014, 2017*, 2018*, 2019*
 Mid Tipperary Under-19 A Football Championship: (1) 
2021*
 Mid Tipperary Minor A Hurling Championship: (4) 
Na Fianna: 1961, 1962, 1963 
JK Brackens: 2016*
 Tipperary Minor B Hurling Championship: (1) 
2004
 Mid Tipperary Minor B Hurling Championship: (3) 
Templemore Brackens: 1990
JK Brackens: 2004, 2012
 Tipperary Minor A Football Championship: (2) 
Templemore Éire Óg: 1973 
JK Brackens: 2018*
 Mid Tipperary Minor A Football Championship: (28) 
Templemore Éire Óg: 1950, 1951, 1952, 1958, 1967, 1968, 1969, 1970, 1971, 1973, 1981, 1982, 1984, 1985, 1986, 1987 
Na Fianna: 1962 
JK Brackens: 1992, 1994, 1998, 1999, 2000, 2007, 2012, 2014, 2016*, 2017*, 2018*

Note: * JK Brackens Óg

Notable players

This lists outlines current or former JK Brackens players that have represented and won provincial or national honours with Tipperary. Further information on parish and club players who have represented Tipperary County teams throughout the years can be seen on this page http://www.tippgaaarchives.com/?page_id=14

Note: *** Represented JK Brackens at juvenile level only

GAA Scór

JK Brackens places a substantial emphases on the cultural aspects of the GAA and has become one of the county's leading Scór clubs gaining recognition nationally. This arm of the club is centered in Clonmore village where these activities are given the same level of credence as on the field activities.

Recent significant successes include Scór Sinsear Set Dancing Munster titles in 2013 & 2017 and an All-Ireland title in 2013. Furthermore, Clonmore man Noel Joyce has won treble Munster and All-Ireland Scór titles in 2013, 2015 and 2017 in the Recitation competition. Additionally, in 2015 Noel coached Ciarán Byrne to claim Scór na nÓg Munster and All-Ireland awards.

Playing Fields

Páirc Shíleáin

Páirc Shíleáin (referred loccaly as "The Park") is the home grounds for the JK Brackens GAA club, is located in the Town Park area of Templemore Town. The pitch was first levelled, sodded and enclosed by local Templemore GAA volunteers in 1924 but this tenancy was initially a turbulent one and involved many strict conditions from landlords Templemore UDC, including no training, a fee per match played and ground sharing with the newly formed Templemore RFC. A suitable agreement was eventually reached between Templemore GAA and the Urban Council in ’53 and the venue was officially opened on 8 May 1955 when the Tipperary played Wexford in a senior hurling tournament. On that occasion the grounds were dedicated to St. Sileann, the patron saint of Templemore.

Tipperary hosted the Kilkenny hurlers on 28 May 1980 marking the officially opening of the clubhouse, The Carroll and Grant Pavilion, named in memory of two local Gaels, Arthur Carroll and Bill Grant who both won All-Ireland football medals with Tipperary in 1920, (it was also this duo who represented the club to first mark out the club grounds when acquired from the council in 1924). A spectator stand was completed in 1994, Tipperary beating Dublin in a hurling challenge on that occasion.

Since the club's foundation, Páirc Shíleáin has been the club's home ground for training and matches for both senior and juvenile clubs. Over these years several additional facilities have been added such as a spectator stand extension, a clubhouse extension, electronic scoreboard, hurling wall with an additional training area

Graffin Sportsfield

Originally the home of Clonmore GAA club, Graffin is used as the club's second pitch for training and occasionally for home games, and it is also rented out to the Knock GAA club for that club's junior B hurling team. Located in the townsland of Graffin directly 1.5 kilometres north of Clonmore village, the grounds were first acquired in 1927, it was levelled and re-sodded in 1987 with the dressing rooms built and open in 1988. During the 1970 and ‘80s the Clonmore club often trained in Templemore as the village field could not handle the increased activity during this period.

References

External links
Tipperary GAA site
J.K. Bracken's GAC website

Gaelic football clubs in County Tipperary
Gaelic games clubs in County Tipperary
Hurling clubs in County Tipperary
1992 establishments in Ireland
Templemore